Colin Wiltshire (3 October 1935 – 18 December 2009) was a Guyanese cricketer. He played in eight first-class matches for British Guiana from 1958 to 1963.

See also
 List of Guyanese representative cricketers

References

External links
 

1935 births
2009 deaths
Guyanese cricketers
Guyana cricketers
Sportspeople from Georgetown, Guyana